Tsoy may refer to one of the following.

An alternative spelling of two different surnames:
Cai (surname), a Chinese surname, in Cantonese pronunciation
Choe (Korean name), especially as a transcription of the Cyrillic Цой
The Shadow of Yesterday, a role-playing game often abbreviated TSoY

See also 
 Tsoi (disambiguation)